Percy Smith (30 September 1887 – 24 May 1974) was an Australian rules footballer who played with Richmond in the Victorian Football League (VFL).

Notes

External links 

1887 births
1974 deaths
Australian rules footballers from Melbourne
Richmond Football Club players